The CNN–News18 Indian of the Year (initially CNN–IBN Indian of the Year) is an award presented annually to various Indians for their work in their respective fields by the Indian media house CNN–News18. The awards are presented in various categories of Politics, Sports, Business, Entertainment, Public Service and Global Indian. The idea of the award was originated by journalists: Rajdeep Sardesai and Sagarika Ghose.

In addition to the traditional award categories of Politics, Business, Sports, Entertainment, Public Service and Global Indian,  a new category, that of a 'CNN-IBN Indian of the Year – Popular Choice' was introduced in the ninth edition, where one awardee was chosen from the 35 nominees across categories basis the votes received from public through Facebook.

Winners

Main awards

Special awards 
1. 2007 

 Lifetime Achievement - R K Laxman

2. 2008 

 Lifetime Achievement - Dilip Kumar

 Special Awards - Tukaram Omble
 Special Awards - Mumbai Police
 Special Awards - Sheila Dikshit 
3. 2009 

 Lifetime Achievement - Pandit Ravi Shankar

 Special Awards - Kamal Haasan
 Special Awards - Indian Cricket Team
4. 2010

 Lifetime Achievement - M. S. Swaminathan

5. 2011 

 Lifetime Achievement - Verghese Kurien

  Outstanding Achievement - K J Yesudas
 Special Awards - Yuvraj Singh
 Special Awards - Manipur Women Gun Survivors Network
 Special Awards - Ronjan Sodhi
6. 2012 

 Lifetime Achievement - Heroes of Rezang La, 1962
 Special Awards - Aamir Khan & Team Satyamev Jayate
 Special Awards - MC Mary Kom
 Special Awards - Tessy Thomas & Team DRDO
7. 2013 

 Outstanding Achievement - Leander Paes
 2013 Outstanding Achievement - Ramakant Achrekar
 Special Awards - Team ITBP and NDRF
 Special Awards - Deepika Padukone
8. 2014
Lifetime Achievement Award: ISRO team
Outstanding Achievement Award: Azim Premji, Kailash Satyarthi
Special Achievement Award: Kangana Ranaut
Popular Choice Award: Kalvakuntla Chandrashekar Rao, P Vijayan
Public Service: Tongam Rina
Politics: Arun Jaitley
Global Indian: Satya Nadella
8. 2015
Lifetime Achievement Award: Balbir Singh Dosanjh
Outstanding Achievement Award: Dr.Bindeshwar Pathak, United Technologies (Make in India)
Special Achievement Award: Kangana Ranaut, Ranveer Singh
Public Service: People of Chennai
Special Jury Award: Leander Paes
10. 2017
Outstanding Achievement in Entertainment (2017): Team Baahubali
12. 2022

 Outstanding Achievement - Sania Mirza, Ranveer Singh
 Special Achievement - Sonu Sood
 Climate Warrior - M. Yoganathan
 Social Change - Shankare Gowda
 Start-ups - Zoho Corporation
 Special Mention - Kulsum Shadab Wahab

See also

 NDTV Indian of the Year

References

Indian awards
Awards established in 2005
2005 establishments in India